In enzymology, a ribitol-5-phosphate 2-dehydrogenase is an enzyme that catalyzes the chemical reaction

D-ribitol 5-phosphate + NAD(P)+  D-ribulose 5-phosphate + NAD(P)H + H+

The 3 substrates of this enzyme are D-ribitol 5-phosphate, NAD+, and NADP+, whereas its 4 products are D-ribulose 5-phosphate, NADH, NADPH, and H+.

This enzyme belongs to the family of oxidoreductases, specifically those acting on the CH-OH group of donor with NAD+ or NADP+ as acceptor. The systematic name of this enzyme class is D-ribitol-5-phosphate:NAD(P)+ 2-oxidoreductase. This enzyme is also called dehydrogenase, ribitol 5-phosphate. This enzyme participates in pentose and glucuronate interconversions.

References 

 

EC 1.1.1
NADPH-dependent enzymes
NADH-dependent enzymes
Enzymes of unknown structure